The Ranney Index is a way to measure a state's competition between the two major political parties in the United States, created by Austin Ranney, a prominent political scientist and expert on political parties. A Ranney Score ranges from 0–1, with a 0.0 signifying complete Republican control and a 1.0 signifying complete Democratic control.1 It is calculated as follows 
The Ranney Index Averages three indicators of party success during a particular time period: the percentage of the popular vote for the parties' gubernatorial candidates, the percentage of seats held by the parties in the state legislature, and the length of time plus the percentage of the time that the parties held both the governorship and a majority in the state legislature

References

Scales